Janowice may refer to:

Janowice, Lower Silesian Voivodeship (south-west Poland)
Janowice, Włocławek County in Kuyavian-Pomeranian Voivodeship (north-central Poland)
Janowice, Łęczyca County in Łódź Voivodeship (central Poland)
Janowice, Łowicz County in Łódź Voivodeship (central Poland)
Janowice, Pabianice County in Łódź Voivodeship (central Poland)
Janowice, Puławy County in Lublin Voivodeship (east Poland)
Janowice, Świdnik County in Lublin Voivodeship (east Poland)
Janowice, Limanowa County in Lesser Poland Voivodeship (south Poland)
Janowice, Miechów County in Lesser Poland Voivodeship (south Poland)
Janowice, Tarnów County in Lesser Poland Voivodeship (south Poland)
Janowice, Wieliczka County in Lesser Poland Voivodeship (south Poland)
Janowice, Silesian Voivodeship (south Poland)
Janowice, Opatów County in Świętokrzyskie Voivodeship (south-central Poland)
Janowice, Ostrowiec County in Świętokrzyskie Voivodeship (south-central Poland)
Janowice, Sandomierz County in Świętokrzyskie Voivodeship (south-central Poland)
Janowice, Koło County in Greater Poland Voivodeship (west-central Poland)
Janowice, Gmina Sompolno in Greater Poland Voivodeship (west-central Poland)
Janowice, Gmina Stare Miasto in Greater Poland Voivodeship (west-central Poland)
Janowice, Gmina Wierzbinek in Greater Poland Voivodeship (west-central Poland)
Janowice, Lubusz Voivodeship (west Poland)
Janowice, Pomeranian Voivodeship (north Poland)

See also
Janovice
Janowiec (disambiguation)
Janowitz